Citizens Telecommunications Company of California Inc. is a telephone operating company of Frontier Communications based in Elk Grove, California. It was established  in 1993 to acquire 5,000 access lines from GTE. In 1996, it acquired 20,000 access lines from Alltel in the Tuolumne and Golden State areas. In 2007, Citizens acquired Global Valley Networks, serving Capay Valley, Livingston, and Patterson. In 2013, Frontier Communications West Coast, a former GTE property serving Crescent City, was merged into Citizens. 

Its operations are separate from Frontier Communications of the Southwest, which serves former Verizon customers Frontier acquired in 2010.

References

External links

Frontier Communications
Communications in California
Telecommunications companies of the United States
Companies based in Sacramento County, California
Elk Grove, California
Telecommunications companies established in 1993
1993 establishments in California